In Nepal, the chief minister is the elected head of government of each of the seven provinces. The chief minister is appointed by the governor of the provinces according to Article 167 of the Constitution of Nepal.

Following the election of the provincial assembly, the governor of each province invites the parliamentary party leader of the party with the majority of the seats to form the government. If no party has a majority the governor invites the party with a majority with support from other parties in the assembly. The appointed chief minister must retain the confidence of the assembly and the term of such a chief minister is as long as the term of the provincial assembly of the province.

Incumbent chief ministers

Qualification 
The Constitution of Nepal sets the qualifications required to become eligible for the office of chief minister. A chief minister must meet the qualifications to become a member of the provincial assembly. A member of the provincial assembly must be:

 a citizen of Nepal
 a voter of the concerned province
 of 25 years of age or more
 not convicted of any criminal offense
 not disqualified by any law
 not holding any office of profit

In addition to this the chief minister must be the parliamentary party leader of the party with the majority seats in the provincial assembly. If no party has a majority the chief minister must have a majority in the assembly with the support from other parties. If within thirty days of the elections the chief minister is not appointed or fails to obtain a vote of confidence from the assembly, the chief minister must be from a party having the largest number of seats in the assembly.

List of chief ministers by province

Koshi Pradesh

Madhesh Province

Bagmati Province

Gandaki Province

Lumbini Province

Karnali Province

Sudurpashchim Province

See also 

 Provincial governments of Nepal
 Governor (Nepal)

References 

Governors
 
Heads of government